Crampe en masse et le hot dog géant is the name of the fifth album by québécois comedy duo Crampe en masse, and the first containing comedy sketches as well as some songs.

Track listing

All tracks written by Crampe en masse (Mathieu Gratton and Ghyslain Dufresne).

Crampe en masse albums
2003 albums
2000s comedy albums